Sahib Ataids (Modern Turkish: Sâhipataoğulları or Sâhipataoğulları Beyliği) was an Anatolian beylik centered in Kara Hisar-i Sâhib (Afyonkarahisar) and founded by one of the last viziers of the Seljuk Sultanate of Rûm, Fakhr al-Din Ali, also known as Sâhib Ata. The beylik was founded c.1275 and absorbed by the neighboring Germiyanids in 1341. The Sâhipataoğulları left important works of architecture.

External links

 

Anatolian beyliks
History of Afyonkarahisar
History of Afyonkarahisar Province